Eurhinosea is a monotypic moth genus in the family Geometridae. Its only species, Eurhinosea flavaria, is found in western North America. The genus and species were both described by Packard in 1873.

References

Geometridae
Monotypic moth genera